The Vidya Sanskar International School for Holistic Learning, also known as Vidya Sanskar, is an international school located near the National Capital Territory of Delhi, India, giving education from Primary to A Level. The school is situated on ten acres in village Bhopani, Faridabad and is affiliated with CIE Cambridge International Examinations. Students take IGCSE Levels, AS Level, and A Level Examinations.

About
The school was inaugurated on 2 February 2006 by the then Vice President of India Bhairon Singh Shekhawat. The school is the best international school in the region, as quoted by the Hindustan Times newspaper. The school's infrastructure is spread over 300,000 square feet of area with additional sports facilities of 20 acres. The school is ranked the sixth best school in India in terms of boarding, and is ranked the 20th best in India covering all the aspects of schooling. Students come from all over the world to experience an international level education with holistic values.

Board of directors
The Board of Directors includes Mr. Shanti Prakash Gupta (Chairman), an industrialist.

See also
Education in India
Education in Delhi
List of schools in Delhi
CBSE

References

External links
 Vidya Sanskar website

Schools in Faridabad
2006 establishments in Delhi
Boarding schools in Delhi
Cambridge schools in India
Educational institutions established in 2006